Canfora is a family name of Italian origin. It may refer to: 

 Alan Canfora, American anti–Vietnam War activist
 Bruno Canfora, Italian composer, conductor and music arranger
 Jack Canfora,  American playwright, actor, musician and teacher
 Jason La Canfora, American sports writer and television analyst 
 Luciano Canfora, Italian classicist and historian
  

Italian-language surnames